The river Simme is a tributary of the river Kander in the Bernese Oberland in the canton of Bern in Switzerland.

The river Simme begins at the Alpine lake of Flueseeli (lit.: "Little Lake of the Flue") on the secluded Alpine meadow just above the Flueschafberg cliffs. But right afterwards, one level and  lower, below the Flueschafberg cliffs, on the Alpine meadow called Rezliberg, it converges with several creeks which have even higher springs, such as the Truebbach, the Rezligletscherbach, and the Ammertenbach.

The river then flows roughly to the north and passes Lenk and flows towards Zweisimmen through the Obersimmental (Upper Simme Valley), where it converges with the Kleine Simme from the west, which origines in the mountains above Saanenmöser. Saanenmöser is also a small pass towards Saanen and Gstaad.

From Zweisimmen the Simme flows further north until  Riedenbach where it smoothly turns east and runs now through the Niedersimmental (Lower Simme Valley). In Oey it converges with the Chirel of the Diemtigtal from the south.

After the village of Wimmis and southwest of Spiez, the Simme turns north again and joins the river Kander, which reaches the Lake Thun after ).

References

Swisstopo Map

Rivers of Switzerland
1Simme
Rivers of the canton of Bern